Watford, a city in England, held its 1998 Watford Borough Council elections on 7 May.  One third of the council was up for election and the Labour party stayed in overall control of the council.

Election result

Ward results

Callowland

Central

Holywell

Leggatts

Meriden

Nascot

Oxhey

Park

Stanborough

Tudor

Vicarage

Woodside

References
 "Council poll results", The Guardian 9 May 1998 page 16

1998
1998 English local elections
1990s in Hertfordshire